Ostforschung ("research on the east") is a German term dating from the 18th century for the study of the areas to the east of the core German-speaking region. At its core, Ostforschung postulated that Germans and Germany were superior to Poles and Poland, and aimed to prove this thesis. The idea of German superiority and Prussian stereotypes about Poles were the core beliefs of this field of research.

Traditional Ostforschung has fallen into disrepute with modern German historians as it often reflected Western European prejudices of the time towards Poles. The term Ostforschung itself remained in use in the names of some journals and institutes throughout the Cold War, but was replaced by more specific terms by the 1990s (e.g., the journal Zeitschrift für Ostforschung, established in 1952, was renamed Zeitschrift für Ostmitteleuropa-Forschung in 1994).

Since the 1990s, Ostforschung itself has become a subject of historical research. The tradition of Ostforschung is now considered discredited by German historians.

Ostforschung was also the name of a multidisciplinary organization set up before World War II by Nazi German chief propagandist Albert Brackmann supporting Nazi genocidal policies, ethnic cleansing and anti-semitism. Brackmann and several other Nazi and nationalist historians and anthropologists co-ordinated Nazi German research on Eastern Europe, mainly the Second Polish Republic. The research conducted by this organisation, as well as the Ahnenerbe, was instrumental in the planning of ethnic cleansing and genocide of local non-German populations in the Generalplan Ost.

See also
 Drang nach Osten
 Generalplan Ost
 Volksdeutsche

References

Sources
 
 
 Józef Szłapczyński, Tadeusz Walichnowski, „Nauka w służbie ekspansji i rewizjonizmu (Ostforschung)”, Interpress, Warszawa 1969.
 Drożdżyński Aleksander, Zaborowski Jan, „Oberländer: Przez „Ostforschung”, wywiad i NSDAP do rządu NRF”, Warszawa 1960.
 „Organizacje przesiedleńców oraz tzw. Ostforschung – narzędzia rewizjonizmu”, „Ost-Mittel Europa” w programie odwetowym „Ostforschung” [w:] „Bezpieczeństwo Europy a groźba militaryzmu zachodnioniemieckiego; materiały międzynarodowej konferencji naukowej Praga 23-27 maja 1961”, Polski Instytut Spraw Międzynarodowych, Warszawa 1961.
 Wróblewski Seweryn Tadeusz, „Ewolucja „Ostforschung” w Republice Federalnej Niemiec”, 1969-1982 (Studium niemcoznawcze Instytutu Zachodniego), Instytut Zachodni, 1986 .
 „Deutsche Ostforschung und polnische „, Wydawnictwo: Poznańskie Towarzystwo Przyjaciół Nauk Poznań 2002, .
 Wacław Długoborski, „Śląsk w oczach zachodnioniemieckiej Ostforschung”, Milan Myška, „Ostforschung w NRF a dzieje Czechosłowacji”, Śląski Instytut Naukowy, Katowice 1962.
 German Scholars and Ethnic Cleansing, 1919-1945 by Michael Fahlbusch and Ingo Haar, Berghahn Books, 2005

Area studies
Eastern Europe
Eastern Front (World War II)
Germany–Poland relations
German words and phrases
Science in Nazi Germany